The Malabar Premier League is a football league that takes place the Malabar region. The league is a franchise league and  kicked off its inaugural season on 7 April 2015 with eight teams.

History
Following the success of the Indian Super League for football in India and the 2015 National Games of India, which were hosted by Kerala, it was announced that the Malappuram District Sports Council, with support from the Kerala Football Association, would launch the Malabar Premier League. The goal of the league would be to get young footballers from the district into a proper playing environment and thus make football a more professionalized sport in the area. On 2 March 2015 the official logo of the league was unveiled, as well as the initial eight franchises.

Venues
For the inaugural season of the Malabar Premier League, the league will use two stadiums. One of the stadiums would be the Malappuram District Sports Complex Stadium and the other being the Kottappadi Football Stadium.

Sponsorship
The Malabar Premier League has been sponsored since the First Season. Kairali TMT are the sponsors of the league in the first Season.

Teams

References

External links
 Official website.

  
Football leagues in India
Football in Kerala
2015 establishments in Kerala